The 2010 UNICEF Open was a tennis tournament played on outdoor grass courts. It was the 21st edition of the UNICEF Open, and was part of the 250 Series of the 2010 ATP World Tour, and of the WTA International tournaments of the 2010 WTA Tour. Both the men's and the women's events took place at the Autotron park in Rosmalen, 's-Hertogenbosch, Netherlands, from 13 June through 19 June 2010. Sergiy Stakhovsky and Justine Henin won the singles titles.

Finals

Men's singles

 Sergiy Stakhovsky defeated  Janko Tipsarević 6–3, 6–0
It was Stakhovsky's first title of the year and 3rd of his career.

Women's singles

 Justine Henin defeated  Andrea Petkovic, 3–6, 6–3, 6–4
 It was Henin's second title of the year and 43rd in her career.

Men's doubles

 Robert Lindstedt /  Horia Tecău defeated  Lukáš Dlouhý /  Leander Paes 1–6, 7–5, [10–7]

Women's doubles

 Alla Kudryavtseva /  Anastasia Rodionova defeated  Vania King /  Yaroslava Shvedova 3–6, 6–3, [10–6]

ATP entrants

Seeds

 Seedings are based on the rankings of June 7, 2010.

Other entrants
The following players received wildcards into the main draw:
  Robin Haase
  Henri Kontinen
  Igor Sijsling

The following players received entry from the qualifying draw:
  Dustin Brown
  Rameez Junaid
  Simon Stadler
  Kristof Vliegen

The following player received the lucky loser spot:
  Rajeev Ram

WTA entrants

Seeds

 Seedings are based on the rankings of June 7, 2010.

Other entrants
The following players received wildcards into the main draw:
  Justine Henin
  Laura Robson
  Arantxa Rus

The following players received entry from the qualifying draw:
  Julie Coin
  Arantxa Parra Santonja
  Anastasia Rodionova
  Sandra Záhlavová

External links
 

UNICEF Open
UNICEF Open
UNICEF Open
Rosmalen Grass Court Championships